Ł or ł,  described in English as L with stroke, is a letter of the Polish, Kashubian, Sorbian, Belarusian Latin, Ukrainian Latin, Wymysorys, Navajo, Dëne Sųłıné, Inupiaq, Zuni, Hupa, Sm'álgyax, Nisga'a, and Dogrib alphabets, several proposed alphabets for the Venetian language, and the ISO 11940 romanization of the Thai script. In some Slavic languages, it represents the continuation of the Proto-Slavic non-palatal  (dark L), except in Polish, Kashubian, and Sorbian, where it evolved further into . In most non-European languages, it represents a voiceless alveolar lateral fricative or similar sound.

Glyph shape Ł

In normal typefaces, the letter has a stroke approximately in the middle of the vertical stem, crossing it at an angle between 70° and 45°, never horizontally. In cursive handwriting and typefaces that imitate it, the capital letter has a horizontal stroke through the middle and looks very similar to the pound sign . In the cursive lowercase letter, the stroke is also horizontal and placed on top of the letter instead of going through the middle of the stem, which would not be distinguishable from the letter t. The stroke is either straight or slightly wavy, depending on the style. Unlike , the letter  is usually written without a noticeable loop at the top.

Polish Ł
In Polish,  is used to distinguish the historical dark (velarized) L [ɫ] from clear L [l]. The Polish  now sounds the same as the English , as in water (except for older speakers in some eastern dialects where it still sounds velarized).

In 1440,  proposed a letter resembling  to represent clear L. For dark L he suggested "l" with a stroke running in the opposite direction to the modern version. The latter was introduced in 1514–1515 by Stanisław Zaborowski in his . L with stroke originally represented a velarized alveolar lateral approximant , a pronunciation that is preserved in the eastern part of Poland and among the Polish minority in Lithuania, Belarus, and Ukraine. This pronunciation is similar to Russian unpalatalised  in native words and grammar forms.

In modern Polish, Ł is usually pronounced  (exactly as w in English as a consonant, as in wet). This pronunciation first appeared among Polish lower classes in the 16th century. It was considered an uncultured accent by the upper classes (who pronounced  as ) until the mid-20th century when this distinction gradually began to fade.

Alternation is also common in declension of nouns, e.g. from nominative to locative, tło → na tle ( → ).

Polish final Ł also often corresponds to Ukrainian word-final  Ve (Cyrillic) and Belarusian  Short U (Cyrillic). Thus, "he gave" is "dał" in Polish, "дав" in Ukrainian, "даў" in Belarusian (all pronounced ), but "дал"  in Russian.

Examples
Notable figures
 Marie Skłodowska Curie, a scientist awarded the Nobel prize in both physics and chemistry, who conducted pioneering research on radioactivity.
 Karol Józef Wojtyła, John Paul II, Pope of the Catholic Church from 1978 to 2005
 Kazimierz Pułaski, known in English as Casimir Pulaski, a Polish soldier and commander, a brigadier general in the Continental Army cavalry during American Revolutionary War 
 Ignacy Łukasiewicz, the inventor of the modern paraffin lamp
 Jan Łukasiewicz, the inventor of Polish notation
 Lech Wałęsa, Polish labor leader and former president
 Stanisław Lem ( or ), Polish writer of science fiction, philosophy, and satire, and a trained physician
 Wisława Szymborska, a Polish poet and recipient of the 1996 Nobel Prize in Literature
 Witold Lutosławski, Polish composer
 Wacław Sierpiński, Polish mathematician
Some examples of words with 'ł':
Władysław
Wisła (Vistula)
Łódź
Łukasz (Lucas / Luke)
Michał (Michael)
Złoty (zloty / golden)

In contexts where Ł is not readily available as a glyph, basic L is used instead. Thus, the surname Małecki would be spelled Malecki in a foreign country. Similarly, the stroke is sometimes omitted on the internet, as may happen with all diacritic-enhanced letters. Leaving out the diacritic does not impede communication for native speakers.

In the 1980s, when some computers available in Poland lacked Polish diacritics, it was common practice to use a pound sterling sign (£) for Ł. This practice ceased as soon as DOS-based and Mac computers came with a code page for such characters.

Other languages
In Belarusian Łacinka (both in the 1929 and 1962 versions),  corresponds to Cyrillic  (El), and is normally pronounced  (almost exactly as in English pull).

In Navajo and Elaponke,  is used for a voiceless alveolar lateral fricative , like the Welsh double L.

 is used in orthographic transcription of Ahtna, an Athabaskan language spoken in Alaska; it represents a breathy lateral fricative.  It is also used in Tanacross, a related Athabaskan language.

When writing IPA for some Scandinavian dialects which involve the pronunciation of a retroflex flap , e.g. in Eastern Norwegian dialects, authors may employ .

When transcribing Armenian into the Latin alphabet,  may be used to write the letter  , for example Ղուկաս => Łukas.

Computer usage
The Unicode codepoints for the letter are U+0142 for the lower case, and U+0141 for the capital.
In the LaTeX typesetting system  and  may be typeset with the commands \L{} and \l{}, respectively.

See also
Ў, ў – short U (Belarusian Cyrillic)
£ – pound sign

References

External links 

Kreska ukośna in Polish Diacritics: How to?, by Adam Twardoch, Polish country delegate at ATypI

L stroke
Belarusian language
L stroke
Navajo language
Polish letters with diacritics